The 2016–17 Hong Kong Second Division League will be the 3rd season of Hong Kong Second Division League since it became the third-tier football league in Hong Kong in 2014–15.

Teams

Changes from last season

From Second Division League
Promoted to First Division League
 Eastern District
 Tung Sing

Relegated to Third Division League
 Tsuen Wan
 Happy Valley

To Second Division League
Relegated from First Division League
 Lucky Mile
 Metro Gallery Sun Source

Promoted from Third Division League
 Central & Western
 Hoi King

League table

References

Hong Kong Second Division League seasons